Sumner is a community and Census Designated Place located in Noble County, Oklahoma, United States, ten miles east of Perry and two miles north of U.S. Route 64. Established prior to statehood along the St. Louis-San Francisco Railway, the post office opened on May 23, 1894. The town was named for Henry T. Sumner, a businessman from Perry. Per the 1905 Oklahoma Territorial Census, Sumner had sixty-four residents. The post office closed July 27, 1957.

The town currently has a population of approximately fifty. At its peak the town had a  bank, post office, two churches, a school, a grain elevator, and a train stop. Currently, the only significant buildings still in use are the Baptist church, the Christian church and the school.

Demographics

References

 Shirk, George H. Oklahoma Place Names. Norman: University of Oklahoma Press, 1987. .

Unincorporated communities in Noble County, Oklahoma
Unincorporated communities in Oklahoma